Justin Ingram may refer to:
Justin Ingram (soccer), American soccer player
Justin Ingram (basketball), American basketball player